Shafer Valve Company is a Mansfield, Ohio-based manufacturer and distributor of piping products, specialising in the gas pipeline and water pumping industries. It is fully owned by Emerson Process Management Valve Automation, Inc., based in St. Louis, Missouri.

Companies based in Ohio
Richland County, Ohio